The 1932 All-Ireland Senior Camogie Championship Final was the 1st All-Ireland Final and the deciding match of the 1932 All-Ireland Senior Camogie Championship, an inter-county camogie tournament for the top teams in Ireland. 

Dublin won the first All-Ireland, captained by Maura Gill.

References

All-Ireland Senior Camogie Championship Final
All-Ireland Senior Camogie Championship Final
All-Ireland Senior Football Championship Finals
Dublin county camogie team matches